Perizoma lugdunaria is a moth belonging to the family Geometridae. The species was first described by Gottlieb August Wilhelm Herrich-Schäffer in 1885.

It is native to Europe.

References

Geometridae
Moths described in 1855